Odontanthias is a genus of marine ray-finned fish in the subfamily Anthiinae and family Serranidae. They are found at rocky reefs in deep water, mainly below . The genus is almost entirely restricted to the Indo-Pacific; O. cauoh of the Saint Peter and Saint Paul Archipelago and O. hensleyi of  the Caribbean are the only species known from outside the Indo-Pacific and evidence indicates that the latter belongs in Anthias.

Species
There are currently 16 recognized species in this genus:

 Odontanthias borbonius (Valenciennes, 1828) (Checked swallowtail)
 Odontanthias caudicinctus (Heemstra & J. E. Randall, 1986) (Black-blotch swallowtail)
 Odontanthias cauoh Carvalho-Filho, Macena & Nunes, 2016 (Red jewelfish)
 Odontanthias chrysostictus (Günther, 1872) (Yellowspots swallowtail)
 Odontanthias dorsomaculatus M. Katayama & Yamamoto, 1986 (Saya de Malha jewelfish)
 Odontanthias elizabethae Fowler, 1923 (Elizabeth's swallowtail)
 Odontanthias flagris Yoshino & Araga, 1975 (Threadfin swallowtail)
 Odontanthias fuscipinnis (O. P. Jenkins, 1901) (Hawaiian jewelfish)
 Odontanthias grahami J. E. Randall & Heemstra, 2006 (Graham's swallowtail)
 Odontanthias hensleyi W. D. Anderson & García-Moliner, 2012 (Puerto Rico swallowtail)
 Odontanthias katayamai (J. E. Randall, Maugé & Plessis, 1979) (Katayama's swallowtail)
 Odontanthias randalli W. T. White, 2011 (Lombok swallowtail)
 Odontanthias rhodopeplus (Günther, 1872) (Rose swallowtail)
 Odontanthias tapui (J. E. Randall, Maugé & Plessis, 1979) (Polynesian swallowtail)
 Odontanthias unimaculatus (S. Tanaka (I), 1917) (Unimaculate swallowtail)
 Odontanthias wassi J. E. Randall & Heemstra, 2006 (Wass's swallowtail)

References

Anthiinae
Taxa named by Pieter Bleeker